The Diocese of Primavera do Leste–Paranatinga is a Latin suffragan Roman Catholic Diocese in the state of Mato Grosso, in the Ecclesiastical province of the metropolitan Archbishop of Cuiabá in Brazil.

Its Cathedral episcopal see is the Catedral São Cristóvão, in Primavera do Leste. It also has a Co-Cathedral Co-Catedral São Francisco Xavier, in Paranatinga.

History 
 On December 23, 1997, the Territorial Prelature of Paranatinga was established on territory split off from the Diocese of Barra do Garças, Diocese of Rondonópolis and Diocese of Sinop
 25 June 2014: Suppressed to become Diocese of Primavera do Leste–Paranatinga

Incumbent Prelates 
(all Latin Rite)

 Territorial Prelate of Paranatinga
 Vital Chitolina, Dehonians (S.C.I.) (December 23, 1997 - December 28, 2011), later Bishop of Diamantino (Brazil) (2011.12.28 – ...)

 Diocesan Suffragan Bishops of Primavera do Leste–Paranatinga
 Derek John Christopher Byrne, Saint Patrick's Society for the Foreign Missions (S.P.S.) (June 25, 2014 - ...), previously Bishop of Guiratinga (Brazil) (2008.12.24 – 2014.06.25)

References

 GCatholic.org, with incumbent biography links
 Catholic Hierarchy

Roman Catholic dioceses in Brazil
Christian organizations established in 1997
Paranatinga, Territorial Prelature of
Roman Catholic dioceses and prelatures established in the 20th century
Territorial prelatures